Enoch Rosekrans House is a historic home located at Glens Falls, Warren County, New York.  It was built about 1855 and is a rectangular -story brick residence that incorporates transitional vernacular Greek Revival / Italianate style design elements.  It features a five-bay facade with central entrance sheltered by a portico with pediment and denticulated cornice.

It was added to the National Register of Historic Places in 1984.

References

Houses on the National Register of Historic Places in New York (state)
Italianate architecture in New York (state)
Houses completed in 1855
Houses in Warren County, New York
National Register of Historic Places in Warren County, New York